ATAŞ, short for "Anadolu Tasfiyehanesi Anonim Şirketi" (literally: Anatolian Refinery Joint-stock Company), is a former oil refinery company in Mersin, southern Turkey. Currently, The facility is used as an oil storage and terminal.

Oil refinery
ATAŞ was established in 1958 following a special agreement between the Turkish government and the foreign oil companies Mobil, Royal Dutch Shell, BP and Caltex. Caltex later sold its share to Mobil.  Currently, the main shareholder is BP with 68%. Other partners are Shell & Turcas Petrol (27%) and Turcas (5%).

The refinery was built by the Swiss contractor Foster Wheeler AG. It was put into operation on 30 April 1962. Its annual production was 3.2 million tonnes. On 7 June 2004, ATAŞ gave up refining crude oil. With the shut down of the refinery after 42-year of production, households and industry facilities in 24 provinces of the Mediterranean and Southeastern Anatolia regions faced fuel oil shortage. Temporary supply from the  far away Tüpraş Kırıkkale Oil Refinery caused an increase of oil prices around 11%.

Oil terminal 
The facility was converted after investments into a large-scale storage and terminal for fuel oil, diesel oil and gasoline. It underwent a renovation between 2004 and 2006 carried out by Foster Wheeler, the original contractor in the 1960s. The terminal on the Mediterranean Sea coast is suitable for docking of high-capacity tankers.

References

Oil storage
Oil terminals
Buildings and structures in Mersin
Oil and gas companies of Turkey
Energy companies established in 1958
Industrial buildings completed in 1962
BP buildings and structures
Shell plc buildings and structures
Akdeniz District
Companies based in Mersin
Industrial buildings in Turkey
Turkish companies established in 1958